The Kimblewick Hunt was formed in 2002 as the result of an amalgamation of the Vale of Aylesbury with the Garth and South Berks hunts.
The hounds are kenneled at Kimblewick, Buckinghamshire; hunt country covers parts of Bedfordshire, Berkshire, Buckinghamshire, Hampshire, Hertfordshire and Oxfordshire. Hunt servants wear yellow livery. Male masters wear traditional hunting scarlet with a yellow collar.

The hunt traditionally organises the Easter Saturday point-to-point at Kimble, near Aylesbury, a highlight in the Buckinghamshire social season. Other point-to-points take place during the season at Kingston Blount.

Kimblewick Hunt has been implicated on two separate occasions for illegally hunting foxes under the smokescreen of trail hunting. The first incident resulted in two convictions, but the second found insufficient evidence of wrongdoing and the investigation was ceased by the Thames Valley Police.

References

Buckinghamshire
Fox hunts in the United Kingdom
Fox hunts in England